The Persuader is a 1957 American Western film directed by Dick Ross and written by Curtis Kenyon. The film stars William Talman, James Craig, Kristine Miller, Darryl Hickman, Georgia Lee and Alvy Moore. The film was released on October 13, 1957, by Allied Artists Pictures.

Plot

Cast           
William Talman as Matt Bonham / Mark Bonham
James Craig as Bick Justin
Kristine Miller as Kathryn Bonham
Darryl Hickman as Toby Bonham 
Georgia Lee as Cora Nicklin
Alvy Moore as Willy Williams
Gregory Walcott as Jim Cleery
Rhoda Williams as Nell Landis
Paul Engle as Paul Bonham
Jason Johnson as Morse Fowler
Nolan Leary as Dan
John Milford as Clint
Frank Richards as Steve

References

External links
 

1957 films
American Western (genre) films
1957 Western (genre) films
Allied Artists films
Films directed by Dick Ross (director)
1950s English-language films
1950s American films